Roar of the Iron Horse is a 1951 American Western Serial film directed by Spencer Gordon Bennet and Thomas Carr and starring Jock Mahoney and Virginia Herrick.

Plot
A railroad agent named Jim Grant opposes hard-nosed German, Karl Ulrich, called The Baron. Head of a strong ring in America, the infamous Baron was thwarted time and time again as he tried to sabotage the building of the transcontinental railroad with all the means to his scope, strategically bribing the local Indians into doing his dirty work.

Cast
 Jock Mahoney as Jim Grant (as Jock O'Mahoney) 
 Virginia Herrick as Carol Lane
 William Fawcett as Rocky
 Harold Landon as Tom Lane (as Hal Landon)
 Jack Ingram as Homer Lathrop
 Mickey Simpson as Cal - Henchman 
 George Eldredge as Karl Ulrich- aka The Baron 
 Myron Healey as Ace -Henchman [Chs.3,4,6,9,10,15]
 Rusty Wescoatt as Scully - Lathrop's Foreman 
 Frank Ellis as Bat - Henchman
 Pierce Lyden as Erv Hopkins - Henchman
 Dick Curtis as Campo - The Baron's Chief Gunman
 Hugh Prosser as Lefty - Henchman [Chs.1-4,7-9]

Critical reception
Cline writes that Roar of the Iron Horse was an outstanding release of 1951.

Chapter titles
 Indian Attack
 Captured by Redskins
 Trapped by Outlaws
 In the Baron's Stronghold
 A Ride for Life
 White Indians
 Fumes of Fate
 Midnight Marauders
 Raid of the Pay Train
 Trapped on a Trestle
 Redskin's Revenge
 Plunge of Peril
 The Law Takes Over
 When Killers Meet
 The End of the Trail
Source:

See also
List of film serials by year
List of film serials by studio

References

External links
AllMovie.com
Cinefania.com
IMDb entry

1951 films
1950s English-language films
American black-and-white films
Columbia Pictures film serials
Films directed by Spencer Gordon Bennet
1951 Western (genre) films
American Western (genre) films
Films with screenplays by George H. Plympton
1950s American films